Appleton Lock 4 Historic District is a historic district containing a 1907-built waterway lock in Appleton, Wisconsin. It was added to the National Register of Historic Places in 1993 for its significance in engineering and transport.

References

External links

Historic American Engineering Record (HAER) documentation, filed under Appleton, Outagamie County, WI:

Historic American Engineering Record in Wisconsin
Historic districts on the National Register of Historic Places in Wisconsin
Locks on the National Register of Historic Places in Wisconsin
National Register of Historic Places in Outagamie County, Wisconsin